The 2014–15 Tunisian Ligue Professionnelle 2 (Tunisian Professional League) season was the 60th season since Tunisia's independence.

Teams
A total of 20 teams will contest the league split into two groups of 10 teams each.
Olympique Béja, LPS Tozeur and Grombalia Sports were the 3 last teams of the 2013–14 Ligue 1 season and were therefore relegated.

Results

Group A

Group B

Playoffs

Promotion playoffs

Relegation playoff

Relegated teams
 Enfida Sports on 28 February 2015 (Week 16 out of 18)
 LPS Tozeur on 14 March 2015 (Week 18 out of 18)
 AS Oued Ellil on 10 April 2015 (relegation playoff)

See also
2014–15 Tunisian Ligue Professionnelle 1
2014–15 Tunisian Ligue Professionnelle 3
2014–15 Tunisian Cup

References

External links
 2014–15 Ligue 2 on RSSSF.com

Tun
2014–15 in Tunisian football
Tunisian Ligue Professionnelle 2 seasons